Elections were held on November 10, 1997, in the Regional Municipality of Ottawa-Carleton. This page lists the election results for Regional Chair, Regional Council, and local mayors and councils of the RMOC in 1997. The 1997 election was the last election for the regional government and the municipalities, as they were merged into the new city of Ottawa for the 2000 elections.

Ottawa West MPP Bob Chiarelli defeated incumbent Peter D. Clark for the chair of the region in a close race.

Regional Chair of Ottawa-Carleton

Results by municipality
Chiarelli only won three of the region's 11 municipalities, but won the two largest, Ottawa and Nepean.

Polls
{| class="wikitable"
|-
! Published Date(s) !! Firm !! Clark !! Chiarelli !! Turmel !! Undecided !! Source
|-
| Nov 3 || EKOS || 33 || 24 || 1 || 42 || <ref>Ottawa Citizen, November 3, 1997, pg A1, "Clark leads Chiarelli in tight race"</ref>
|}

Regional Council

Cumberland

Mayoral race

Council

Gloucester

Mayoral race

Council

Goulbourn

Mayoral race

Council

Kanata
Mayoral race

Council

Nepean

Mayoral race

Council

Osgoode
Mayoral race

Council
Four elected at large. Elected councillors indicated in bold.

Ottawa

Mayoral race

Rideau
Mayoral race

Council

Rockcliffe Park
Mayoral race

Council
Four elected at large. Elected councillors indicated in bold.

Vanier
Mayoral race

Council

West Carleton
Mayoral race

Council

School trustees
English Language Public Board
The Ottawa Board of Education and the Carleton Board of Education were set to merge in 1998, and would become the Ottawa-Carleton District School Board, covering all of Ottawa-Carleton. Voters selected the trustees for the new board, which had yet to be named.

 

SourcesOttawa Citizen, November 11, 1997, editionOttawa Sun'', November 11, 1997, edition

Municipal elections in Ottawa
1997 Ontario municipal elections